Flaviaesturariibacter amylovorans is a Gram-negative, rod-shaped and non-motile bacterium from the genus of Flaviaesturariibacter which has been isolated from estuarine water from Jeollabuk-do in Korea.

References

Chitinophagia
Bacteria described in 2015